Life Support is a British television medical drama series, written and devised by Ashley Pharoah, that first broadcast on BBC1 on 19 July 1999. Produced by BBC Scotland, the series follows the work of clinical ethicist Katherine Doone (Aisling O'Sullivan) and her colleagues based at Glasgow's Caledonian hospital. Just a single series of six episodes were broadcast, with the final episode broadcasting on 23 August 1999. The series was directed by Richard Laxton and Morag Fullerton, while Matthew Hall, Peter Hall and Andrea Earl contributed scripts. Art Malik, Richard Wilson, Gilbert Martin and Julie Graham are also credited as principal members of the cast.

O'Sullivan said of her role in the series; "Initially, when I read the script and saw that it was a medical drama, I wasn't interested, but then I saw that it was addressing these subjects in a very different way from what we're used to. Medicine has become so complicated that the man in the street doesn't know what's going on. So this is a new and necessary discipline." Series creator Ashley Pharoah said of O'Sullivan's casting; "As soon as we saw her audition tape, we knew. She had just what we wanted. You can believe the intellectual stature. the gravitas; she's young and attractive - and she can do comedy. She is perfect for Katherine."

Notably, the series remains unreleased on VHS or DVD. The Evening Standard noted of the series axing; "On the whole, Life Support failed to captivate audiences, although several critics liked it."

Cast

 Aisling O'Sullivan as Dr. Katherine Doone
 Art Malik as Dr. Kamran Blake 
 Richard Wilson as John Doone 
 Gilbert Martin as James McConnell
 Julie Graham as Alison McIntyre 
 Edith MacArthur as Joan Andrews 
 Ellie Haddington as Fiona Drummond 
 Stephen Moyer as Dr. Tom Scott 
 Brian Pettifer as Gordon Travers 
 Paul Goodwin as Rod Kerr 
 Georgina Sowerby as Sally Rivers
 Gregor Truter as Dr. David McKewan

Episodes

References

External links

1999 British television series debuts
1999 British television series endings
1990s British drama television series
1990s British medical television series
1990s British television miniseries
BBC Scotland television shows
BBC television dramas
English-language television shows
Television shows set in Scotland